Károly Hadaly (1743, in Gúta, currently Kolárovo – 1834, in Pest) was a Hungarian mathematician. He studied at the University of Trnava, where he earned doctorates in philosophy and law. He was a professor of mathematics in Nagyszombat (currently Trnava), in Győr, in Pécs, in Pozsony (currently Bratislava) and in Budapest. From 1810 to 1831 he taught mathematics and physics in the Institutum geometricum.

Works of Károly Hadaly 

 Elementa hydrotechnica - Bratislava, 1783
 Ars delineandi, coloribusque localibus adumbrandi cadem - Győr, 1784
 Anfangsgründe der Mathematik - Bratislava, 1791
 Mechanica solidorum Budapest, 1808

External links
 Hadaly Károly

1743 births
1834 deaths
People from Kolárovo
19th-century Hungarian mathematicians
18th-century Hungarian mathematicians